The second cycle of Indonesia's Next Top Model aired weekly on Indonesian private broadcaster NET. starting November 4, 2021. This cycle, the number of contestants increased, making the total of 18 contestants. Luna Maya and Panca Makmun returned as host and resident judge, while Deddy Corbuzier and Patricia Gouw were replaced by guest judge and mentor from the first cycle, Ivan Gunawan and Ayu Gani. This cycle's prizes are cash amounting to hundreds of millions of Rupiahs, an all new Suzuki XL7 car unit, as well as Samsung Galaxy Z Flip 3 5G which also served as the official partner for this cycle.

This cycle was filmed under strict health protocols as it was produced during the COVID-19 pandemic. While the previous cycle featured a local destination, this cycle didn't feature any local nor international destination. However, the grandfinalists took a trip to Pahawang Island of Lampung during the final episode.

The winner of the competition was 21-year-old Sarah Gabriella Tumiwa, from Jakarta.

Format changes
In this cycle, the contestants have to split into two groups in each photoshoot, in which each model has both an individual and a group shot with their assigned team. The contestants on the team with the best group photo on panel are automatically immune from elimination regardless of their individual photo's result, while one contestant of the losing team will be eliminated. In addition, following the format of Germany's Next Top Model, the panel challenge in front of the judges in this cycle is almost always replaced by a runway challenge. Based on the individual and group photos and the runway challenge, the judges decide who is safe and who is eliminated from the competition. The group system, however, is dismissed after the comeback episode as the competition reached the final seven, so that only individual photos and runway challenge count in determining who is eliminated from the competition.

Cast

Contestants
(Ages stated are at start of contest)

Judges
 Luna Maya (host)
 Panca Makmun
 Ivan Gunawan
 Ayu Gani

Episodes

Result

Call-out order

 The contestant was part of a non-elimination bottom two
 The contestant was returned the competition
 The contestant was eliminated
 The contestant won the competition

Bottom two / four

 The contestant was eliminated after their first time in the bottom two. 
 The contestant was eliminated after their second time in the bottom two. 
 The contestant was eliminated after their third time in the bottom two. 
 The contestant was eliminated after their fourth time in the bottom two. 
 The contestant was eliminated and placed as the runner-up/s.

Average call-out order
Episode 40 is not included.

Photo / video shoot guide

Episode 1 photo shoot: Extreme shot with bees & jewelries
Episode 3 photo shoot: Body flipping in mid air
Episode 5 photo shoot: Stories of Marionettes in an abandoned house
Episode 7 video shoot: "Brand New Me" fashion film while showcasing new hairstyles
Episode 9 photo shoot: Classical ballet in white
Episode 11 photo shoot: Twofold illusion atmosphere on billboard with Samsung Galaxy Z Flip 3 5G
Episode 13 commercial: "Can You Flip with Us?" in different activity scenes
Episode 15 photo shoot: Quirky avant-garde on a swing
Episode 17 photo shoot: Tribal women in the jungle
Episode 19 photo shoot: Humanoid robot
Episode 21 photo shoot: High fashion with poultries
Episode 23 music video: Romantic night bar ambience for Kaleb J's "It's Only Me"
Episode 25 photo shoot: Icy beauty shoot in a bathtub
Episode 27 photo shoot: Top 5 vs Eliminees on stilts in pairs
Episode 29 photo shoot: Theatrical artwork
Episode 31 photo shoot: Lovers in the rain with Kevin Suan
Episode 33 photo shoot: Glam and elegant while hanging on chandelier
Episode 35 photo shoot: Fighting in action
Episode 37 photo shoot: Dramatical Victorian painting with Danella Ilene
Episode 39 photo shoot: Goddesses on Pahawang Island

Makeovers
Following the previous season, after the comeback episode, the remaining seven finalists got a second makeover.

Trivia 
 Audya Ananta, the fifth winner of this was supposed to join in cycle 1, but, because she got a positive COVID-19 test, she was unable to compete in the competition and ended up joining cycle 2 instead.

See also 
 Indonesia's Next Top Model
 Indonesia's Next Top Model (cycle 1)
 Indonesia's Next Top Model (cycle 3)

References

External links
 
 

Indonesia's Next Top Model
2021 Indonesian television seasons
2022 Indonesian television seasons